Kim Ju-won (also known as Gim Ju-won, Kim Juwon) was a relative of King Hyegong of Silla. After his death in 780, Kim Ju-won, who was one of the pretenders to the throne of Silla, failed to arrive in the capital in time, due to heavy rains. This was interpreted as a bad omen, and his popularity declined. The throne was seized by Wonseong of Silla.

To appease Kim Ju-won, Wonseong gave him the title of sigeup (식읍; 食邑) and wang of Myeongju, and gave the position of a Prime Minister to his son, Kim Heonchang. Heonchang would however lead a rebellion against the royal authority some time later.

Sources

Silla people
8th-century births
Year of death unknown